Alan Hobbs (born 11 March 1944) was an English cricketer. He was a right-handed batsman and right-arm medium-pace bowler who played for Cambridgeshire. He was born in Cambridge.

Hobbs made a single List A appearance for the team, during the 1965 Gillette Cup, scoring 4 runs.

Hobbs' father, Ernest, played for Cambridgeshire in the Minor Counties Championship between 1927 and 1933.

External links
Alan Hobbs at Cricket Archive 

1944 births
Living people
English cricketers
Cambridgeshire cricketers